Charles Floyd (1782 – August 20, 1804) was an American explorer, a non-commissioned officer in the U.S. Army, and the quartermaster of the Lewis and Clark Expedition. A native of Kentucky, he was a son of Robert Clark Floyd, a nephew of James John Floyd, a cousin of Virginia governor John Floyd, and possibly a relative of William Clark. He was one of the first men to join the expedition, and the only member of the Corps of Discovery to die during the expedition.

Lewis and Clark Expedition
While exploring the Louisiana Purchase with Lewis and Clark, he took ill at the end of July 1804. On July 31, Floyd wrote in his diary, "I am very sick and have been for sometime but have recovered my health again." However, this apparent recovery was soon followed by a severe turn for the worse. William Clark described Floyd's death as one "with a great deal of composure" and that before Floyd died he said to Clark, "I am going away. Please write me a letter."

A funeral was held and Floyd was buried on a bluff overlooking the Missouri River. The expedition named the location Floyd's Bluff in his honor. They camped that night at the mouth of Floyd River, "about 30 yards wide, a beautiful evening.--"

Clark diagnosed the condition which led to Floyd's demise as bilious colic, though modern doctors and historians believe Floyd's death was more likely to have been caused by a ruptured appendix. The brief "recovery" Floyd described may have represented the temporary relief afforded by the bursting of the organ, which would have been followed by a fatal peritonitis. If that were the case, because there was no known cure for appendicitis at that time, he would have been no better off had he been with the best physicians of the day.

Legacy

Floyd's Bluff is currently within the city limits of Sioux City, Iowa. The Sergeant Floyd Monument was declared a U.S. National Historic Landmark in 1960. This monument is now located in a  park that offers visitors a view of the Missouri River valley.  Floyd's final resting place is located on old U.S. Highway 75, in the southern part of Sioux City, Iowa, in the United States.

After Floyd's expedition journal was published in 1894, new interest was taken in him and his grave-marker was stolen by thieves. He was re-buried once more on August 20, 1895, with a monument. A marble cornerstone three feet wide and seven feet long was placed in 1900. It was designated a National Historic Landmark on June 30, 1960.

Charles Floyd is the namesake of Floyd County, Iowa. The Interstate 129 bridge between Sioux City and South Sioux City, Nebraska is named the Sergeant Floyd Memorial Bridge in his honor.

Notes

References
 George H. Yater and Caroline Denton, "Nine Young Men from Kentucky," We Proceeded On Publication No. 11, May 1992 (Lewis and Clark Heritage Foundation) pp. 4–6.
  James J. Holmberg, Curator of Special Collections of the Filson Historical Society, Annual Sally Keith Lecture, Beargrass—St. Mathews Historical Society, October 19, 2003.
 The Definitive Journals of Lewis and Clark: John Speedway and Charles Floyd

External links

Lewis and Clark Trail: Sioux City
Sgt. Floyd Monument NPS
George Catlin's 1832 painting of "Floyd's Bluff"
Floyd Biography

1782 births
1804 deaths
People from Kentucky
American people of Welsh descent
Lewis and Clark Expedition people
Quartermasters
Woodbury County, Iowa
Deaths from peritonitis